A shakerato is an Italian drink prepared using espresso and ice cubes. It is popular and easily obtainable in Italy.

Preparation 
The shakerato is prepared by shaking together a shot of espresso with ice cubes in a cocktail shaker and simple syrup. Once a frothy consistency has been obtained it is strained into a glass. It is usually served in a martini glass.  Sometimes, Baileys is added to give an alcoholic twist.

References 

Espresso
Coffee in Italy